Nesuchyně is a municipality and village in Rakovník District in the Central Bohemian Region of the Czech Republic. It has about 400 inhabitants.

Notable people
Miroslav Klůc (1922–2012), ice hockey player

Gallery

References

Villages in Rakovník District